Marc Benno (born July 1, 1947 in Dallas, Texas) is an American singer-songwriter and guitarist.

Benno teamed with Leon Russell to form the Asylum Choir in the late 1960s. He launched a solo career in the early 1970s, with the 1972 album Ambush being his most commercially successful. He wrote the song "Rock 'n Roll Me Again", which was recorded by the band The System for the soundtrack of the 1985 film Beverly Hills Cop; the soundtrack won a Grammy Award. Benno also worked with musicians such as The Doors, Eric Clapton, Stevie Ray Vaughan, Clarence White and Rita Coolidge. Benno was the second guitar player on several tracks for the Doors' album L.A. Woman, alongside Robby Krieger.

Discography

Albums

References

External links

1947 births
Living people
American blues singer-songwriters
American blues guitarists
American male guitarists
Electric blues musicians
Musicians from Dallas
Singer-songwriters from Texas
Guitarists from Texas
20th-century American guitarists
20th-century American male musicians
American male singer-songwriters